The 25th District of the Iowa Senate is located in central Iowa, and is currently composed of Butler, Grundy, Hardin, and Story Counties.

Current elected officials
, Annette Sweeney is the senator representing the 25th District.

The area of the 25th District contains two Iowa House of Representatives districts:
The 49th District (represented by Dave Deyoe)
The 50th District (represented by Pat Grassley)

The district is also located in Iowa's 4th congressional district, which is represented by Randy Feenstra.

Past senators
The district has previously been represented by:

Wally Horn, 1983–1992
Richard Varn, 1993–1994
Robert Dvorsky, 1994–2002
Daryl Beall, 2003–2012
Bill Dix, 2013–2018
Annette Sweeney 2018–Present

See also
Iowa General Assembly
Iowa Senate

References

25